The 1979 Hockey Junior World Cup was the first edition of the Hockey Junior World Cup organized by FIH for national teams of players under the age of 21. The tournament was hosted in Versailles, France from 23 August to 2 September 1979. Pakistan won the inaugural tournament defeating West Germany 2–0 in the final.

Background 
The International Hockey Federation was looking to expand the global exposure of the game through introducing new competitions under its own organization. The Junior Hockey World Cup was introduced six months after the introduction of the Hockey Champions Trophy. France hosted the first tournament and the trophy was called the Roger Danet Challenge Cup named after the President of FIH Roger Alain Danet.

Teams 
The following twelve teams participated in the tournament on invitational basis.

Preliminary round

Pool A

Pool B 

Fixtures

Classification round

Ninth to twelfth place classification

Crossovers

Eleventh and twelfth place ( 11th — 12th )

Ninth and tenth place ( 9th — 10th )

Fifth to eighth place classification

Crossovers

Seventh and eighth place ( 7th — 8th )

Fifth and sixth place ( 5th — 6th )

Knockout round

Semi-finals

Third and fourth place

Final

Final standings

References 

Hockey Junior World Cup
Junior World Cup
International field hockey competitions hosted by France
Hockey Junior World Cup
Hockey Junior World Cup
Hockey Junior World Cup
Versailles
Sport in Yvelines